Oidematops ferrugineus is a species of fly in the family Sciomyzidae. It is the sole member of its genus.

References

Sciomyzidae
Insects described in 1920